Sharonville Transmission is a Ford Motor Company transmission factory in Sharonville, Ohio. Sharonville's heavy transmission product is the 10R140 transmission used in Super Duty pickups. They are still running the 6R140 from 2006 in small quantities. In 2019 the plant was awarded another 900 mil to go along with the 200 mil awarded to them in 2015 to continue running current product and also introduce the 10R80, 10R80 diesel, and future 10R100.  

Products:
 Ford 4100 transmission
 Ford 5R110W transmission
 Ford 4R70W transmission
 Ford 5R55S transmission
 Ford FN transmission
 Ford CD4E transmission
 Ford 10R80 and 10R140 transmissions

See also
 List of Ford factories

References

External links
Livonia transmission

Ford factories
Motor vehicle assembly plants in Ohio
Buildings and structures in Hamilton County, Ohio